The following list of Carnegie libraries in Texas provides detailed information on United States Carnegie libraries in Texas, where 32 public libraries were built from 30 grants (totaling $649,500) awarded by the Carnegie Corporation of New York from 1898 to 1915. In addition, an academic library was built at Wiley College in Marshall from a $15,000 grant awarded March 26, 1906.

Today 13 of these buildings survive, with 10 listed on the National Register of Historic Places. They were often designed by the leading Texas architects of the day. For example, the now-demolished main libraries in Dallas, Houston, and San Antonio were works by James Riely Gordon, the master architect of county courthouses.

Key

Public libraries

Academic library

Notes

References

Note: The above references, while all authoritative, are not entirely mutually consistent. Some details of this list may have been drawn from one of the references without support from the others.  Reader discretion is advised.

Texas
Libraries
 
Libraries